Prairie Hall is an unincorporated community in Mount Zion Township, Macon County, Illinois, United States.

References

Unincorporated communities in Macon County, Illinois
Unincorporated communities in Illinois